James E. Reynolds (December 3, 1920 – March 2, 1986) was an American Negro league outfielder in the 1940s.

A native of Little Rock, Arkansas, Reynolds played for the Birmingham Black Barons in 1946. In five recorded games, he posted two hits in 15 plate appearances. Reynolds died in Little Rock in 1986 at age 65.

References

External links
 and Seamheads

1920 births
1986 deaths
Birmingham Black Barons players
Baseball outfielders
Baseball players from Arkansas
Sportspeople from Little Rock, Arkansas
20th-century African-American sportspeople